Trust deed or deed of trust may refer to:
 Deed of trust (real estate), as distinguished from the general concept of a deed
 Trust instrument, a legal instrument in common law systems
 Trust Deed (Protected), used in Scottish law